Vidyasagar Vidyapith Boys' School,  popularly known as Bangla School, is one of the oldest school located in Midnapore town and it is also one of the best school in midnapore West Bengal, India.  This school was established with the blessings of Ishwar Chandra Vidyasagar , the illustrious educationist and social reformer of Bengal, on 22 August 1845. In 2011 this institution was declared a " Heritage School" by the heritage commission, government of West Bengal.

The school follows the course curricula of West Bengal Board of Secondary Education (WBBSE) and West Bengal Council of Higher Secondary Education (WBCHSE) for Standard 10th and 12th Board examinations respectively.

The school celebrated the 150 th year of its existence on 22 August 1994 in a befitting manner.  The ceremony was graced by Raghunath Reddy, then Governor of West Bengal.

Notable alumni
Bimal Dasgupta-freedom fighter

References

http://vidyasagarvidyapithboys.org

High schools and secondary schools in West Bengal
Schools in Paschim Medinipur district
Educational institutions established in 1845
1845 establishments in British India